This is a list of Chinese national-type primary schools (SJK(C)) in Negeri Sembilan, Malaysia. As of June 2022, there are 82 Chinese primary schools with a total of 17,781 students.

List of Chinese national-type primary schools in Negeri Sembilan

Jelebu District

Kuala Pilah District

Port Dickson District

Rembau District

Seremban District

Tampin District

Jempol District

See also 

 Lists of Chinese national-type primary schools in Malaysia

References

Schools in Negeri Sembilan
Negeri Sembilan
 Chinese-language schools in Malaysia